One Way Love may refer to:

Music

Albums
One Way Love, album by The Bellamy Brothers 1996

Songs
One Way Love (Bert Berns song) a 1964 song written by Berns and Ragovoy under the pseudonyms Russell & Meade; recorded by The Drifters, Cliff Bennett and The Rebel Rousers 1964, The Gamblers 1965, The Screamers (Germany) 1967, and latterly Dexy's Midnight Runners in 1980
One Way Love (Agnetha Fältskog song)
One Way Love (TKA song)
One Way Love (Hyolyn song)
"One Way Love", a song by Bandit (band) 1978
"One Way Love", a song by The Damned 1977 written by Nick Mason
"One Way Love", a song by The Distractions 1980
"One Way Love", a song by The Innocents   1980
"One Way Love", a song by Rock Goddess from the album Rock Goddess (1983)
"One Way Love", a song by The Undertones 1983 written by J. J. O'Neill
"One Way Love", a song by Bryan Ferry from the album Frantic (2002)